The Canadian Nautical Research Society (CNRS; , SCRN) was originally established as the Canadian Society for the Promotion of Nautical Research, then incorporated 25 October 1984 under its current name and achieved the status of a registered charity shortly thereafter.

The objectives of the Society are:
 to promote nautical research in Canada
 to disseminate the results of such research, and
 to encourage an awareness of Canada's maritime heritage
To those ends, the Society publishes in association with the North American Society for Oceanic History a quarterly journal The Northern Mariner/Le marin du nord and a quarterly newsletter Argonauta; holds an annual conference; and makes several awards:
 the Jacques Cartier MA Prize in Maritime Affairs, to encourage graduate students at the Master's level
 the Gerry Panting Award, which is a bursary to a young scholar to attend the annual conference to present a paper, and
 the Keith Matthews Awards, named in honour of the Society's first President, to recognize outstanding publications in the field of nautical research.
The Society is also the Canadian national sub-commission of the International Commission for Maritime History.

External links
 The Canadian Nautical Research Society / Société canadienne pour la recherche nautique

Naval history of Canada

1982 establishments in Ontario
Maritime organizations
Historical societies of Canada
Organizations established in 1982
Maritime history organizations